Allium rotundum, common name round-headed leek or purple-flowered garlic, is a Eurasian and North African species of wild onion. Its native range extends from Spain and Morocco to Iran and European Russia. It is  sparingly naturalized in parts of the United States (Michigan and Iowa). The species grows in disturbed habitats such as roadsides, cultivated fields, etc.

Allium rotundum produces large clumps of as many as 50 egg-shaped bulbs, each up to 1.5 cm long. Leaves are up to 40 cm long. Scapes are up to 90 cm tall. Umbels look round from a distance, and can contain as many as 200 flowers. Flowers are bell-shaped, up to 7 mm across; tepals purple, sometimes with white margins; anthers yellow or purple; pollen yellow or white.

References

External links 
 

rotundum
Onions
Flora of Europe
Flora of temperate Asia
Flora of North Africa
Plants described in 1762